Lake Full of Fish is a lake in Kanabec County, in the U.S. state of Minnesota.

Lake Full of Fish is the English translation of the native Ojibwe-language name.

See also
List of lakes in Minnesota

References

Lakes of Minnesota
Lakes of Kanabec County, Minnesota